Streptomyces axinellae is a bacterium species from the genus of Streptomyces which has been isolated from the sponge Axinella polypoides in Banyuls-sur-Mer in France. Streptomyces axinellae produces axinelline A and tetromycin B.

See also 
 List of Streptomyces species

References

Further reading

External links
Type strain of Streptomyces axinellae at BacDive -  the Bacterial Diversity Metadatabase

axinellae
Bacteria described in 2009